The Junkers Jumo 109-012, known colloquially post-war as Jumo 012, was a turbojet engine under development in Germany during the Second World War. In essence, it was a scaled up version of the Jumo 004 (the Jumo 004 had already reached serial production by 1944). It was intended to power the EF 132 and variants of the Ju 287.

Development

After the Jumo 004 had entered serial production, the Technical Department of the RLM requested Junkers to build a much larger engine capable of powering the heavy jet bombers then under development for the Luftwaffe. Initially, Junkers proposed modifications of the Jumo 004, specifically the 109-004G and 109-004H. However, these variants were rejected as they were not powerful enough, and Junkers began to design the 109-012.

The engine was to feature an 11-stage axial compressor enclosed in a sheet-steel casing and a 2-stage, air-cooled turbine. It was proposed that a bleed air system should be installed after the fifth compressor stage to supply compressed air, if needed. The RLM ordered ten pre-production examples of the 109-012 to be built at Dessau for testing, where several parts for the engines including nine exhaust cones were already completed. In December 1944, the RLM issued an order to Junkers calling for the firm to cease development on the 109-012, and further design work was moved to several other firms. By the end of the war, only one mock-up had been completed.

Specifications

See also

Notes

Bibliography

 

1940s turbojet engines
012